Rosebud is an unincorporated community and census-designated place in Rosebud County, Montana, United States.

History

In 1878, Rosebud began as a small post office referred to as Beeman, on the Fort Keogh–Bozeman Stage Line. In 1882 the Northern Pacific Railroad and named the town Rosebud.

Geography
Rosebud is a river town located on the south bank of the Yellowstone River, approximately 1.5 miles east of the intersection of the Yellowstone River and Rosebud Creek. Interstate 94 passes south of the town.

Notable person

 Captain William Clark led part of the Lewis and Clark Expedition through this area on the Yellowstone River in 1806

Education
The Rosebud High School is the highest level of education offered for the town. Enrollment is 31 with a student teacher ratio of 4:1. The team name is the Wranglers.

References

Census-designated places in Montana
Unincorporated communities in Rosebud County, Montana
Unincorporated communities in Montana